Balázs Ottó Sebestyén (born 18 July 1977, Budapest, Hungary) is a Hungarian television presenter and winner of multiple "Story Ötcsillag" prizes.

Shows 

Sebestyén began his career as presenter of a music request program. Since then, he has done a big number of variety shows mainly on RTL Klub.

In addition to many radio-television deal he signed a major breakfast show on Class FM with János Vadon and Ferenc Rákóczi.

Personal life 
He was married in summer of 2009 to Viktória Horváth. They have two children Benett and Noel Sebestyén.

Books 
 2008: Sebestyén Balázs: "Szigorúan bizalmas"(Strictly Confidential) (Published by I.A.T. - )- in support of the Gast Royal.

Awards 
 2008 Story Ötcsillag award, Best Presenter
 2009 Story Ötcsillag award, Best Presenter

References

External links 
 
 
 Sebestyén Balázs links
 Szigorúan Bizalmas
 2008 Story Ötcsillag-díj 
 Műsorvezető adatbázis

1977 births
Living people
Hungarian television personalities